Seppälä is a Finnish surname and toponym derived from the occupation of blacksmith ("seppä").

People
Arttu Seppälä (born 1987), football player
Eino Seppälä (1896–1968), runner
Henkka Seppälä (born 1980), bass guitarist
Hanna-Maria Seppälä (born 1984), swimmer
Ilpo Seppälä (born 1953), wrestler
Jenae Seppälä (born 1986), American football player
Leonhard Seppälä (1877–1967), Norwegian-American Sled dog musher
Matti Seppälä (born 1941), geomorphologist and geographer
Pete Seppälä (born 1978), singer
Tuomas Seppälä, guitarist

Other
 Seppälä, a Finnish clothing store chain established in 1930. It declared bankruptcy on September 15, 2017

References

Finnish-language surnames
Surnames of Finnish origin